The Witman Boys is a 1997 Hungarian drama film directed by János Szász. It was screened in the Un Certain Regard section at the 1997 Cannes Film Festival. At the 20th Moscow International Film Festival the film won the FIPRESCI Prize and Szász won the Silver St. George for Best Director. The film was selected as the Hungarian entry for the Best Foreign Language Film at the 70th Academy Awards, but was not accepted as a nominee.

Cast
 Maia Morgenstern - Mrs. Witman
 Alpár Fogarasi - János Witman
 Szabolcs Gergely - Ernö Witman
 Lajos Kovács - Dénes Witman
 Dominika Ostalowska - Irén
 Péter Andorai - Endre Tálay
 István Holl - Mihály Szladek
 Juli Sándor - Eszti
 Péter Blaskó - Elegant Gentleman
 György Barkó - Dissector
 Tamás Kalmár - Corpse Carrier
 Zsolt Porcza - Zöldi
 Ákos Horváth - Physical Instructor
 Lajos Szücs - Guest
 Sándor Kassay - Person on Duty
 Arnold Kilin - Twin

See also
 List of submissions to the 70th Academy Awards for Best Foreign Language Film
 List of Hungarian submissions for the Academy Award for Best Foreign Language Film

References

External links

1997 films
1997 drama films
1990s Hungarian-language films
Hungarian drama films
Films directed by János Szász